Cymbiola rutila, common name the "Blood-red Volute", is a species of large sea snail, a marine gastropod mollusk in the family Volutidae, the volutes.

Description
The shell attains a length of 74 mm.

Habitat
Volutes are predators that live in deep waters, 
where they stalk and kill other molluscs. 
Volutes do not have a free-swimming larval stage. 
Their large egg capsules contain enough food 
to allow the embryos to develop over several months. 
What emerges from these capsules are tiny but fully formed shells. 
Volutes tend to spend their life in colonies, and have small home ranges.

Distribution
This marine species occurs off New Britain and Western Australia.

References

External links 
 Sowerby, G. B., I. (1844). Descriptions of six new species of Voluta. Proceedings of the Zoological Society of London. 1844: 149–152
 Cox, J. (1873). Descriptions of new species of land and marine shells from Australia and the Solomon and Louisiade Islands. Proceedings of the Zoological Society of London. 1873: 564-569
 Crosse H. (1867). Diagnoses molluscorum novorum. Journal de Conchyliologie. 17: 444-449
 Crosse H. (1880). Description de mollusques inédits, provenant de la Nouvelle-Calédonie et de la Nouvelle-Bretagne. Journal de Conchyliologie. 28: 142-149

Volutidae